Adriaan van der Burg (1693–1733) was an 18th-century painter from the Northern Netherlands.

Biography

Van der Burg was born and died in Dordrecht.  According to Jan van Gool he was the pupil of Arnold Houbraken and accompanied him to Amsterdam where he completed his education before returning to Dordrecht, where he became a popular portrait painter and the teacher of Aert Schouman and Cornelis Greenwood. Schouman made the engraving voor Jan van Gool's book based on a self-portrait that Schouman bought from Adriaan van der Burg's widow.

According to the RKD he was the teacher of Aert Schouman and was known for interior decorations.

References

Adriaan van der Burg on Artnet

1693 births
1733 deaths
18th-century Dutch painters
18th-century Dutch male artists
Dutch male painters
Artists from Dordrecht